Hamfallow is a civil parish in the district of Stroud, Gloucestershire.  There is no village centre, the parish consists of farms and hamlets such as Abwell, Breadstone, Halmore, Mobley and Wanswell.

The westernmost portion of the parish boundary follows the River Severn, across which is the parish of Lydney in the Forest of Dean district. The other adjoining parishes are all in the Stroud district, these are: Hinton to the north-west; Slimbridge to the north-east; Cam to the east; Stinchcombe to the south-east; Alkington to the south; whilst both Ham and Stone and Berkeley lie to the south-west.

Hamfallow was in Thornbury Rural District  until the RDC was abolished in 1974.  The greater part was transferred into the new county of Avon, as part of the new district of Northavon but a group of parishes in the north of the district, around Berkeley, wished not to transfer into the new county, but chose instead to remain with Gloucestershire, under the new Stroud District Council. These were the parishes of Hinton, Hamfallow, Ham and Stone, Alkington, and Berkeley itself. With the demise of Avon, in 1996, Hamfallow remained with the main county of Gloucestershire.  Today, Hamfallow is represented by the county councillor for Berkeley Vale division and the two district councillors for Berkeley ward on Stroud District Council.

References

 David Verey, Gloucestershire: the Vale and the Forest of Dean, The Buildings of England edited by Nikolaus Pevsner, 2nd ed. (1976) , p. 259

Civil parishes in Gloucestershire
Stroud District